Elephant art may refer to:

Art by elephants, paintings etc. made by elephants
Art depicting elephants, pictures etc. showing elephants